This article provides details of international football games played by the Tunisia A' national football team from 2008 to present.

Results

See also 
 Tunisia A' national football team

Notes

References

Tunisia national football team results